Silvano Nater Carungal (born 27 February 2000) is a Portuguese footballer who plays for Trikala as a forward.

Football career
He made his professional debut for Trikala on 16 January 2021 in the Super League Greece 2.

References

External links

2000 births
Living people
Portuguese footballers
Association football forwards
Super League Greece 2 players
Trikala F.C. players
Portugal youth international footballers